West Newton is a hamlet in the East Riding of Yorkshire, England. In 1935, both the townships of Marton and West Newton were merged into the civil parish of Burton Constable.

History
In 1870–72, John Marius Wilson's Imperial Gazetteer of England and Wales described West Newton like this:

NEWTON (West), a township, with a village, in Aldbrough parish, E. R. Yorkshire; miles N E of Hull. Acres, 778. Real property, £3, 218. Pop., 220. Houses, 30. An hospital was founded here, prior to 1179, by William Earl of Albemarle.

Natural resources
The area around West Newton has been the site of test drilling for gas and oil. In 2014, people complained that noxious fumes were being emitted from a site near to the village and the smell was making them sick.

If the assessment is correct, it would be the biggest onshore gas and oilfield in the United Kingdom.

References

External links

Villages in the East Riding of Yorkshire
Holderness